RiseUp Summit is an annual entrepreneurship and innovation event that takes place in Cairo, Egypt. It has been described as "one of the largest gatherings of entrepreneurs in the region". It started in 2013 to bring the MENA region's entrepreneurship ecosystem together. The summit is a three-day, entrepreneurship marathon. The first RiseUp Summit occurred in 2013.

After attending Austin's SXSW for the first time, founding partner Muhammad M. Mansour was inspired to co-create RiseUp Summit, with the support of other ecosystem players.

About RiseUp 
RiseUp is a platform that connects startups to the most relevant resources, worldwide.

Scam Allegations 
In September, 2021 Wamda published a report that startups who won the startup competition by RiseUp did not get the amount they were promised and reports from other founders appeared that they also did not get paid the reward after winning the startups competition in Cairo.

Participants 
Previous participating firms include Uber, IBM, Facebook, The World Bank and Pepsi. Speakers have included Dave McClure from 500Startups, Mike Butcher from TechCrunch, Jared Friedman from Y Combinator and H.E John Casson.

References

Further reading
 

Annual events in Egypt
Entrepreneurship organizations